Teymur Suri may refer to:

Teymur Suri-ye Olya
Teymur Suri-ye Sofla